Capsella grandiflora is a species of flowering plant in the Brassicaceae family. It is referred to by the common name grand shepherd's-purse and is a close relative of Arabidopsis thaliana. It is predicted together with Capsella orientalis to be the surviving progenitor of Capsella bursa-pastoris.

The main signature of this plant compared to other Capsella species is its wide flower petals. Together with Capsella rubella, this plant is used as a model plant to study the evolution of self-incompatibility into self-compatibility in plant reproduction.

References

grandiflora
Plants described in 1843
Taxa named by Louis Athanase Chaubard
Taxa named by Pierre Edmond Boissier